The Serra do Cabral State Park is a state park in the state of Minas Gerais, Brazil.

Location

The Serra do Cabral State Park is divided between the municipalities of Buenópolis and Joaquim Felício in  Minas Gerais.
The park is in the north-central region of the state in the Serra do Cabral range, part of the Espinhaço Mountains.
The park is on the watershed between the das Velhas and Jequitaí rivers, both right tributaries of the São Francisco River.
There are many waterfalls and natural pools.
Springs in the park supply water to the urban areas of Buenópolis and Joaquim Felício.

Vegetation includes forest and cerrado, including evergreens and sweet palmetto (Euterpe edulis).
Fauna include the threatened South American tapir (Tapirus terrestris).
The park holds many prehistoric archaeological sites.
There are cave paintings representing animals in several places.

History

The Serra do Cabral State Park was created by decree 44.121 of 29 September 2005.
The park became part of the Espinhaço Mosaic of conservation units, created in 2010.
As of 2014 access to the park was restricted, since the archaeological sites were still being studied.
The management plan was published in June 2015.

Notes

Sources

State parks of Brazil
Protected areas established in 2005
2005 establishments in Brazil
Protected areas of Minas Gerais